Travis Holdman is a Republican member of the Indiana Senate, representing the 19th District since 2008. He was elected to the State Senate in March 2008, after the death of David C. Ford. Holdman has championed legislation to make texting while driving illegal in Indiana.

References

External links
 Travis Holdman at Ballotpedia
Virtual Office of Senator Travis Holdman official Indiana State Legislature site
 

Living people
Republican Party Indiana state senators
21st-century American politicians
Year of birth missing (living people)